Domenico Zipoli (1688-1726) was a composer from the Baroque period. He worked and died in Córdoba, in the Viceroyalty of Peru, Spanish Empire, (presently in Argentina). He became a Jesuit in order to work in the Reductions of Paraguay where he taught music among the Guaraní people. He is remembered as the most accomplished musician among Jesuit missionaries.

Early training and career
Zipoli was born in Prato, Italy, where he received elementary musical training. However, there are no records of him having entered the cathedral choir. In 1707, and with the patronage of Cosimo III, Grand Duke of Tuscany, he was a pupil of the organist Giovani Maria Casini in Florence. In 1708 he briefly studied under Alessandro Scarlatti in Naples, then Bologna and finally in Rome under Bernardo Pasquini. Two of his oratorios date to this early period: San Antonio di Padova (1712) and Santa Caterina, Virgine e martire (1714). Around 1715 he was made the organist of the Church of the Gesù (the mother church for the Society of Jesus), in Rome, a prestigious post. At the very beginning of the following year, he finished his best-known work, a collection of keyboard pieces titled Sonate d'intavolatura per organo e cimbalo.

Jesuit musician-missionary
For reasons that are not clear, Zipoli traveled to Sevilla, Spain, in 1716, where, on 1 July, he joined the Society of Jesus with the desire to be sent to the Reductions of Paraguay in Spanish Colonial America. Still a novice, he left Spain with a group of 53 missionaries who reached Buenos Aires on 13 July 1717.

He completed his formation and sacerdotal studies in Córdoba (in contemporary Argentina) (1717–1724) though, for the lack of an available bishop, he could not be ordained priest. All through these few years he served as music director for the local Jesuit church. Soon his works came to be known in Lima, Peru. Struck by an unknown infectious disease, Zipoli died in the Jesuit house of Córdoba, on 2 January 1726. A previous theory placing his death in the ancient Jesuit church of Santa Catalina, in the hills of the Province of Córdoba, has now been discredited. His burial place has never been found.

Legacy
Zipoli continues to be well known today for his keyboard works; many of them are well within the abilities of beginning to intermediate players, and appear in most standard anthologies. His Italian compositions have always been known but recently some of his South American church music was discovered in Chiquitos, Bolivia: two Masses, two psalm settings, three Office hymns, a Te Deum laudamus and other pieces. A Mass copied in Potosí, Bolivia in 1784, and preserved in Sucre, Bolivia, seems a local compilation based on the other two Masses. His dramatic music, including two complete oratorios and portions of a third one, is mostly gone. Three sections of the 'Mission opera' San Ignacio de Loyola – compiled by Martin Schmid in Chiquitos many years after Zipoli's death, and preserved almost complete in local sources – have been attributed to Zipoli.

Media

Notes

References
Ayestarán, Lauro. Domenico Zipoli, Vida y obra, Montevideo, 1962.
Franze, Juan Pedro, La obra completa para órgano de Domenico Zipoli, Buenos Aires, 1974.
Gasta, Chad M. "Opera and Spanish Evangelization in the New World", Gestos 44, 2008, 85–106.
Illari, Bernardo. Domenico Zipoli: Para una genealogía de la música clásica latinoamericana (Havana: Fondo editorial Casa de las Américas, 2011).
Militello, Sergio. Il sogno musicale di un Paradiso in Terra. Domenico Zipoli (1688-1726), Presentation by Pope Francis, Libreria Editrice Vaticana, Città del Vaticano 2018, (pp. 254),

External links
 
 
 The Zipoli Institute
 The Association 'Prato for Zipoli'
 Discos Qualiton published the entire works by Domenico Zipoli. Domenico Zipoli. Complete Works for Organ; Misa en fa Mayor para coro, solistas, cuerdas y bajo contínuo, and Complete works for harpsichord.

Italian Baroque composers
Composers for pipe organ
1688 births
1726 deaths
18th-century Italian Jesuits
Jesuit missionaries
People from Prato
Italian male classical composers
18th-century Italian composers
18th-century Italian male musicians
Italian Roman Catholic missionaries
Jesuit missionaries in Argentina
Italian expatriates in Argentina
Jesuit musicians